Hasselkopf is a mountain on the southern periphery of Braunlage, Germany. It is 612 m high.

The hill is mostly covered in grass and undeveloped, but its northern slope has a short ski lift and can be used for downhill skiing in the winter months.

On 7 May 1964, the hill was used by Gerhard Zucker to unsuccessfully attempt to demonstrate the use of mail rockets. One exploded in an accident, killing three.

References

Goslar (district)
Mountains of Lower Saxony
Mountains of the Harz
Braunlage